Grand Ayatollah Sayyid Alaaeldeen bin Musa bin Mohammed Ali Almusawi Alghurayfi  (Arabic:  آية الله العظمى السيد علاء الدين بن موسى بن محمد علي الموسوي الغريفي) (born 1945) is an Iraqi Twelver Shi'a Marja'.

He has studied in seminaries of Najaf, Iraq under Grand Ayatollah Abul-Qassim Khoei and Mohammad Shahroudi.

See also
List of Maraji

Notes

External links
 حول الانتخابات المقبلة
العلامة الكبير سماحة السيد علاء الدين الغريفي في ضيافة حوزة النور الأكاديمية

Iraqi grand ayatollahs
Iraqi Islamists
Shia Islamists
1945 births
Living people
Al-Moussawi family